Enyalius is a genus of lizards in the family Leiosauridae. The genus is native to Brazil and Uruguay.

Species in the genus Enyalius are mostly insectivorous (meaning they eat insects and other invertebrates), diurnal (active during the day), and arboreal (inhabit trees). There are eleven known species of this genus. The reproductive timing for the species E. perditus occurs typically in warm and wet seasons and is typically shorter than other species of this genus. These lizards lay eggs and have a clutch size (number of eggs laid at one time) of about 3–11.

Species
Enyalius bibronii 
Enyalius bilineatus  – two-lined fathead anole
Enyalius boulengeri  – Brazilian fathead anole
Enyalius brasiliensis  – Brazilian fathead anole
Enyalius capetinga Breitman et al., 2018
Enyalius catenatus  – Wied's fathead anole
Enyalius erythroceneus 
Enyalius iheringii  – Ihering's fathead anole
Enyalius leechii  – Leech's fathead anole
Enyalius perditus 
Enyalius pictus 

Nota bene: A binomial authority in parentheses indicates that the species was originally described in a genus other than Enyalius.

References

Further reading
Wagler J (1830). Natürliches System der AMPHIBIEN, mit vorangehender Classification der SÄUGTHIERE und VÖGEL. Ein Beitrag zur vergleichenden Zoologie. Munich, Stuttgart and Tübingen: J.G. Cotta. vi + 354 pp. + one plate. (Enyalius, new genus, p. 150). (in German and Latin). (archive).

Enyalius
Lizard genera
Lizards of South America
Taxa named by Johann Georg Wagler